Confederate Cemetery Monument is a monument that includes a cemetery for veterans of the Confederate States Army during the American Civil War, especially the Battle of Farmington under General Joseph Wheeler, in Farmington, Tennessee, U.S. It includes four walls around the cemetery and a "pyramid-topped obelisk". A historical marker on  reads "In the cemetery north of the road are buried
Confederate soldiers of the Army of Tennessee, who fell while opposing Rosecrans' Army of the Cumberland through Liberty Gap and Guy's Gap, in late June 1863. Also buried here are soldiers of Forrest's Cavalry, killed in minor operations.". It has been listed on the National Register of Historic Places since July 11, 2001.

References

External links
 
 

Cemeteries on the National Register of Historic Places in Tennessee
Confederate States of America cemeteries
Buildings and structures completed in 1874
National Register of Historic Places in Marshall County, Tennessee